Chahar Padshahan ("Four Kings") is the name of a mosque in Lahijan, Iran, where four rulers of the Karkiya dynasty are buried.

Sources 
 

Mosques in Gilan Province